Kedah, also known by its honorific Darul Aman and historically as Queda, is a state of Malaysia, located in the northwestern part of Peninsular Malaysia. The state covers a total area of over 9,000 km2, and it consists of the mainland and the Langkawi islands. The mainland has a relatively flat terrain, which is used to grow rice, while Langkawi is an archipelago, most of which are uninhabited islands.

Kedah was previously known as Kadaram by the ancient and medieval Tamils, Kataha or Kalahbar (or) by the Arabs, and Syburi by the Siamese when it was under their influence.

To the north, Kedah borders the state of Perlis and shares an international boundary with the Songkhla and Yala provinces of Thailand. It borders the states of Perak to the south and Penang to the southwest.

The state's capital is Alor Setar and the royal seat is in Anak Bukit. Other major towns include Sungai Petani (its largest urban area by population), and Kulim on the mainland, and Kuah on Langkawi.

History

Early history

Around 788 BCE, a systematic government of a large settlement of Malay native of Kedah had already established around the northern bank of Merbok River. The state consisted a large area of Bujang Valley, covering Merbok and Muda River branches about 1000 square miles area. The capital of the settlement was built at the estuary of a branch of Merbok River, now known as Sungai Batu. Archaeological evidence found in Bujang Valley (Malay:Lembah Bujang) reveals that a Animism kingdom ruled ancient Kedah possibly as early as 110 A.D. The discovery of temples, jetty remains, iron smelting sites, and clay brick monuments dating back to 110 A.D shows that a maritime trading route with south Indian Tamil kingdoms was already established since that time. The discoveries in Bujang Valley also made the ancient Kedah as the oldest civilisation of Southeast Asia.

Hindu-Buddhist Era
Reference to ancient Kedah was first mentioned in a Tamil poem Paṭṭiṉappālai written at the end of the second century A.D. It described goods from Kadaram "heaped together in the broad streets" of Chola capital. Other than Kadaram, Kedah was known with different names at varying times in Indian literature; Kataha-Nagara (in Kaumudi Mahotsava drama), Anda-Kataha (in Agni Purana), Kataha-Dvipa (in Samarāiccakahā), and Kataha (in Kathasaritsagara). In the middle eastern literature, ancient Kedah was referred as Qilah by Ibn Khordadbeh in Kitāb al Masālik w'al Mamālik, Kalah-Bar by Soleiman Siraf & Abu Zaid al Hassan in Silsilat-al-Tawarikh (travels in Asia), and Kalah by Abu-Dulaf Misa'r Ibn Muhalhil in Al-Risalah al-thaniyah. The famous Tang dynasty Buddhist monk, Yi Jing who visited Malay archipelago between 688 and 695, also mentioned about a kingdom known as Ka-Cha in the northern part of the Malay peninsula, which according to him was 30 days sail from Bogha (Palembang), the capital of Sribogha (Srivijaya).

In the seventh and eighth centuries, Kedah was under the loose control of Srivijaya. Indian and Arab sources consider Kedah to be one of the two important sites during the Srivijaya period, often calling the king of the straits "the ruler of Srivijaya and Kataha". In 1025, Rajendra Chola, the Chola king from Coromandel Coast in South India, captured Kedah in his Chola invasion of Srivijaya and occupied it for some time. A second invasion was led by Virarajendra Chola of the Chola dynasty who conquered Kedah in the late 11th century. During the reign of Kulothunga Chola I Chola overlordship was established over the Srivijayan province of Kedah in the late 11th century.

Kedah Sultanate

According to Hikayat Merong Mahawangsa or the Kedah Annals, Kedah was founded by a Hindu king named Merong Mahawangsa. According to the text further, the Sultanate of Kedah started in year 1136 when King Phra Ong Mahawangsa converted to Islam and adopted the name Sultan Mudzafar Shah.  However, an Acehnese account gave a date of 1474 for the year of conversion to Islam by the ruler of Kedah.  This later date accords with an account in the Malay Annals where a raja of Kedah visited Malacca during the reign of its last sultan seeking the honour of the royal band that marks the sovereignty of a Muslim ruler. However, in Thai chronicles told that Kedah was a Thai city like Nakhon Si Thammarat and was a part of Siamese kingdom but later was changed into a Malay state after invasion of Muslim kingdoms until today.

It was later under Siam, until it was conquered by the Malay sultanate of Malacca in the 15th century. In the 17th century, Kedah was attacked by the Portuguese after their conquest of Malacca, and by Aceh. In the hope that Great Britain would protect what remained of Kedah from Siam, the sultan handed over Penang and then Province Wellesley to the British at the end of the 18th century. The Siamese nevertheless invaded Kedah in 1821, and it remained under Siamese control under the name of Syburi. In 1896, Kedah along with Perlis and Setul was combined into the Siamese province of Monthon Syburi which lasted until transferred to the British by the Anglo-Siamese Treaty of 1909.

Incorporation into Malaya

In World War II, Kedah (along with Kelantan) was the first part of Malaya to be invaded by Japan. The Japanese returned Kedah to their Thai allies who had it renamed Syburi, but it returned to British rule after the end of the war. Kedah became one of the states of the Federation of Malaya in 1948, which then achieved independence in 1957. Malaya was then enlarged to become Malaysia in 1963.

Since 2017, the hereditary Sultan of Kedah has been Sultan Sallehuddin. The Kedah Sultanate began when the ninth Kedah Maharaja Derbar Raja or Phra Ong Mahawangsa, converted to Islam and changed his name to Sultan Mudzafar Shah I. Since then there have been 27 Sultans who ruled Kedah.

On 11 May 2018, Mahathir Mohamad son Mukhriz Mahathir took his oath of office before Kedah Sultan Tunku Sallehuddin Ibni Almarhum Sultan Badlishah in a ceremony held in Istana Anak Bukit.

Geography 

The Pedu Lake is the largest man-made lake in the state.

Government

Executive

Kedah's Constitution was promulgated by its Ruler in July 1950.  The various provisions laid down in the Constitution include the role and powers of the Monarch, the State Parliament and the State's Civil Service.

The Sultan of Kedah is the constitutional ruler of the State. His position is hereditary and he holds office for life. The Ruler is the head of the religion of Islam in the State and the executive power of the state government is vested in him. The current Sultan is Sultan Sallehuddin ibni Almarhum Sultan Badlishah, who has reigned since 12 September 2017 after his elder brother Sultan Abdul Halim died on 11 September 2017.

The State Executive Council, which along with the Sultan is Kedah's executive branch of government. It is composed of the Menteri Besar, who is its chairman and Kedah's head of government, and ten other members. The Menteri Besar and other members of the council are appointed by the Sultan of Kedah from members of the Kedah State Legislative Assembly (Dewan Undangan Negeri Kedah).

Legislature

The state also has a State assembly, called the Kedah State Legislative Assembly. It is similar to the Parliament but is limited to making laws relating to the state. Its members are elected in elections which are usually held simultaneously with federal elections. The term of each state assembly member is limited to five years. The state assembly must be dissolved before or once it expires its term for a fresh election to elect its members.

Departments 
 Kedah State Finance and Treasury Office
 Kedah Irrigation and Drainage Department
 Kedah State Forestry Department
 Kedah Social Welfare Department
 Kedah Syariah Judiciary Department
 Kedah Public Works Department
 Kedah State Islamic Religious Affairs Department
 Kedah Public Service Commission
 Kedah State Agriculture Department
 Office of Lands and Mines Kedah
 Kedah State Mufti Department
 Kedah Town and Country Planning Department
 Department of Veterinary Services of Kedah

Statutory bodies 
 Mahmud College Board
 Kedah State Paddy Farmers Development Board
 Kedah State Islamic Religious Council
 Kedah Public Library Corporation
 Kedah State Water Resources Board
 Kedah State Development Corporation
 Kedah State Museum Board
 Kedah State Zakat Board

Administrative divisions

Modern Kedah is divided into 12 administrative districts, 12 local governments and 132 mukims.

Local governments 

 Alor Setar City Council
 Baling District Council
 Bandar Baharu District Council
 Kubang Pasu Municipal Council
 Kulim Hi-Tech Industrial Park Local Authority
 Kulim Municipal Council
 Langkawi Municipal Council
 Padang Terap District Council
 Pendang District Council
 Sik District Council
 Sungai Petani Municipal Council
 Yan District Council

Demographics 

Kedah has a relatively heterogeneous populace constituted by three major ethnic groups; the Malays, Chinese and Indians as well as some Malaysian Siamese ethnic groups, similar to most of the other Malaysian states. Prior to the formation of the Federation of Malaya, there was an ethnic group known as the Sam Sam people. They are culturally Malay Muslim but speak Siamese language. Most of these communities are almost extinct due to assimilation with the Malays. In some places in Kedah, the Sam Sam people still retain their Siamese language as their mother tongue. These communities can be found in Pendang District, Kuala Nerang District and Kubang Pasu District (Changlun, Kodiang, Jitra, Wang Tepus, Guar Napai, Malau, Ason and Napoh). Kedah has a very small Orang Asli community. Orang Asli is mainly to be found in the Baling district, as their community crosses there into the neighboring state of Perak.

Language 
Like most parts of Malaysia, Kedah is home to various languages and dialects. The majority language of Kedah is Kedah Malay, known natively by locals as Pelat Utagha (Northern dialect), it is a distinct variety of Malay which also serves as the state's main lingua franca and is used by almost all Kedahans regardless of race. Kedah Malay has many sub-dialects which differs from district to district and is also spoken outside of its boundaries such as Penang, Perlis, northern Perak and even as far as Satun in Thailand and Tanintharyi in Myanmar. Besides Kedah Malay, another distinct variety of Malay known as Baling Malay (Cakak Baling) is mainly spoken in Baling district as well as some parts of Sik and Yan districts. Baling, along with Grik Malay is part of Reman Malay, an offshoot of Kelantan-Pattani Malay of which it was descended from the people of the Kingdom of Reman of which once ruled the Baling and Grik regions before it was dissolved and became part of three distinct political entities namely Kedah, Perak and Yala (Thailand).

Besides Malay, there are also various minority languages spoken throughout Kedah, Aslian languages such as Jahai, Kensiu and Kintaq are spoken by the small Orang Asli populations mostly in the inland region. The Chinese in Kedah also speaks various varieties of Chinese such as Mandarin, Hokkien and so on. There are also a small but well established Indian community mostly of ethnic Tamil and also smaller number of Telugus, Malayalees and Punjabis who speak Telugu, Malayalam and Punjabi. Kedah is also home to a large community of ethnic Siamese of which it has its own distinct dialect of the Thai language which is different from ones spoken in Kelantan (which also has a large Siamese population) and Standard Thai.

Ethnicity
The population of Kedah in 2015 was 2,071,900. It was made up of 76% Bumiputra (Malays and others), 12.7% Chinese, 6.9% Indian, 0.9% others and 3.4% non-Malaysian.
The following is based on 2015 figures from the Department of Statistics Malaysia.

Religion

As of 2010 the population of Kedah is 77.2% Muslim, 14.2% Buddhist, 6.7% Hindu, 0.8% Christian, 0.6% unknown / none, 0.3% Taoist or Chinese religion followers, 0.1% followers of other religions, and 0.1% non-religious.

Statistics from the 2010 Census indicate that 94.3% of the Chinese population are identified as Buddhists, with significant minorities of adherents identifying as Christians (2.4%), Chinese folk religions (2.4%) and Muslims (0.4%). The majority of the Indian population are Hindus (91.7%), with a significant minorities of numbers identifying as Christians (3.7%), Muslims (2.4%) and Buddhists (1.3%). The non-Malay bumiputera community are predominantly Christians (39.7%), with significant minorities identifying as Muslims (26.9%) and Buddhists (26.3%). All Malays are Muslims.

Economy 

Kedah is considered the "rice bowl" of Malaysia, accounting for about half of Malaysia's total production of rice. In 2008, the state government banned the conversion of paddy fields to housing and industrial lots to protect the rice industry.

Tourism, particularly on the island of Langkawi is of growing importance.

More recently, Kedah has forged its economy towards the automotive and aerospace industries with Modenas and Asian Composites setting up bases here.  One of the main advantages is the low labour costs and the infrastructure in place with the North–South Expressway and the Penang International Airport close by. In 1996, the Kulim Hi-Tech Park was officially opened as the first high technology industrial park in Malaysia. The Park comprises a total land area of approximately 14.5 square kilometres (5.6 mi2).

According to the Ninth Malaysia Plan, this economic area is part of the Northern Corridor Economic Region (NCER). The Northern Corridor Economic Region is one of three development regions formed in Peninsular Malaysia; other development regions being the Iskandar Malaysia (or South Johor Economic Region) and the East Coast Development Region.

Timeline of tallest structures

Education

Public universities and colleges
The state has a campus of Universiti Utara Malaysia (UUM), which is located in Bandar Baru Sintok. It was formally incorporated on 16 February 1984. The university was established with the specific mission of providing a leadership role for management education in the country. The academic establishments in UUM include College of Business (COB), College of Law, Government and International Studies (COLGIS) and College of Arts and Sciences (CAS).

Kedah also has several public universities and colleges such as Universiti Teknologi MARA (UiTM) in Merbok, the Malaysian Spanish Institute of Universiti Kuala Lumpur (UniKL MSI) and the Polytechnic Institute of Sultanah Bahiyah (PSB) in Kulim, the Asian Institute of Medicine, Science and Technology (AIMST University) in Bedong, Kolej Universiti Insaniah (KUIN) a.k.a. UNISHAMS (Kuala Ketil, Baling Kedah) in Mergong and the Polytechnic Institute of Sultan Abdul Halim Mu'adzam Shah (POLIMAS) in Jitra.

There are 2 teacher training institution in Kedah, Institut Pendidikan Guru Kampus Sultan Abdul Halim (IPGKSAH) in Sungai Petani and Institut Pendidikan Guru Kampus Darul Aman (IPGKDA) in Bandar Darulaman that are set up by the government to provide teaching courses for trainee teachers.

Private universities and colleges
Private universities and colleges that are located in Kedah include the Open University of Malaysia (OUM) Regional Learning Center for the state of Kedah and Perlis at Sungai Petani, the Albukhary International University in Alor Setar, Pusat Bahasa Titian Jaya the PTPL College and the Cosmopoint College.

Technical institutes
Kedah houses three technical institutes that are affiliated with MARA, that is Institut Kemahiran MARA Sungai Petani, Institut Kemahiran MARA Alor Setar and Institut Kemahiran MARA Sik.

Boarding schools

This state also has several boarding schools such as Sekolah Berasrama Penuh and MARA Junior Science College or MRSM.

National islamic schools
This state also has several secondary Islamic schools (Sekolah Menengah Kebangsaan Agama) such as Tahfiz Model Ulul Albab or TMUA.

Sekolah Menengah Kebangsaan Agama Baling (SMKAB)
Sekolah Menengah Kebangsaan Agama Sik (SMKAS)
Sekolah Menengah Kebangsaan Agama Kedah (TMUA School) (SMKAK)
Sekolah Menengah Kebangsaan Agama Yan (SMKAY)

Boarding school 
 Maktab Rendah Sains MARA Kubang Pasu
 Maktab Rendah Sains MARA Langkawi
 Maktab Rendah Sains MARA Merbok
 Maktab Rendah Sains MARA PDRM Kulim
 Maktab Rendah Sains MARA Pendang
 Maktab Rendah Sains MARA Baling
 Sekolah Menengah Sains Sultan Mohamad Jiwa (SAINS KEDAH)
 Sekolah Menengah Sains Pokok Sena (SAINA)
 Sekolah Menengah Sultan Abdul Halim (SMSAH)
 Sekolah Berasrama Penuh Integrasi Kubang Pasu (I-KUPs)
 Sekolah Menengah Sains Kubang Pasu (KUPSIS)

Private and public schools

Consists of several private and public primary school or secondary school. Public secondary school such as SMK Taman Jelutong, Keat Hwa Secondary School, Convent Secondary School (Formerly known as St. Nicholas Convent Secondary School), Kolej Sultan Abdul Hamid, Sekolah Menengah Kebangsaan Sultan Badlishah, Sin Min Secondary School, Chio Min Secondary School, SMK Sultanah Asma, SMK Convent Father Barre, SMK Khir Johari, SMK Kota Kuala Muda, SMK Tunku Ismail, SMK Aman Jaya, SMK Bedong, SMK Bakar Arang, SMK Darulaman, SMK Ibrahim, K Jit, SMK Mahsuri, SMK Tunku Panglima Besar, Keat Hwa Secondary School, SMK Guar Chempedak, SMK Yan etc. Private secondary school such as Keat Hwa High School, Sin Min High School and SM Sin Min.

Tourism

Tourism is mainly concentrated on Langkawi Island, the largest island in the archipelago. There are some places of interest on the mainland as well.

Kedah Mainland

 Alor Setar Tower - The third tallest tower in Malaysia, standing tall at 165.5-metre in height.
 Balai Nobat
 Balai Seni Negeri
 Batu Hampar Waterfall
 Bujang Valley Archaeological Museum – The only museum in Malaysia to display archaeological artefacts proving the existence of international trade and development of the Hindu Buddha religion in South-East Asia in the 3rd – 12th century
 Junjong Waterfall
 Kota Kuala Kedah
 Lata Mengkuang Waterfall
 Lembah Bujang Archaeological Park
 Pantai Merdeka 
 Kuala Muda - The Kota Kuala Muda Tsunami Memorial and the next door Tsunami Gallery are poignant reminders of the devastating tsunami which took place on 26 December 2004 following a powerful 8.9 magnitude earthquake off the coast of Sumatra.
 Pantai Murni Waterfront
 Pekan Rabu (Wednesday Market) – A multi-storey arcade selling a wide range of traditional delicacies, handicraft products and apparel
 Rumah Merdeka
 Seri Perigi Waterfall
 Sungai Merbok Recreation Park
 Sungai Sedim Tree Top Walk – The longest canopy walk in the world stretching 950m-long
 Ulu Muda Eco Park
 Ulu Paip Recreational Forest
 Hutan Paya Laut
 Ulu Legong Hot Springs – The only 24-hours hot spring, located 22 km from Baling
 Wat Nikrodharam – revered as being the primary Buddhist house of worship in Kedah's state capital, Alor Setar
 Titi Hayun Waterfall
 Gunung Jerai
 Zahir Mosque (Masjid Zahir) – One of Kedah's most distinctive architectural landmarks, it is one of the oldest mosques in the country

Langkawi

The Langkawi International Airport is located at Padang Matsirat and it is also considered a tourist attraction as the Langkawi International Maritime and Aerospace Exhibition takes place every 2 years near the airport. The airport handled almost 1.2 million passengers and over 41,000 aircraft movements in 2008. It serves as the primary gateway into Langkawi.

In 2007, Langkawi Island was given a World Geopark status by UNESCO.

Places of interest
 MAHA Tower Langkawi - The fourth tallest tower in Malaysia, standing tall at 138-metre in height.
 Mount Mat Cincang (Gunung Mat Cincang)
 SkyBridge Langkawi
 SkyCab Langkawi
 3D Art in Paradise Langkawi
 Underwater World Langkawi
 Tanjung Rhu Beach
 Cenang Beach
 Pasir Tengkorak Beach
 Dayang Bunting Lake
 Kota Mahsuri
 Craft Complex Langkawi
 Dataran Lang
 Upsido Langkawi Upside Down House
 SkyTrex Adventure Langkawi
 Galeria Perdana
 Langkawi Wildlife Park
 Kilim Geoforest Park
 Crocodile Adventureland
 MARDI Agro Technology Park
 UMGAWA Zipline Eco Adventure
 Langkawi Adventure & Xtreme Park 
 Pulau Payar Marine Park
 Beras Basah Island  
 Field of Burnt Rice
 Hot Springs
 Telaga Tujuh (The Seven Wells) 
 Beach of Black Sand
 Tasik Dayang Bunting (Lake of the Pregnant Maiden)
 Gua Cerita (Cave of Stories) 
 Gua Langsir (Curtain Cave)

Sports 
In 2006, Kedah hosted the 11th Sukma Games. The opening and closing ceremonies were held at the Darul Aman Stadium in Alor Setar.
Football is the most favorite sport in kedah as well as sepak raga. Kedah FA is a professional football team in Malaysian that represent the state of Kedah and under the supervision of Kedah Football Association. Kedah FA currently play in the Malaysia Super League, and they are the only team in the history of Malaysian football to ever achieved a double treble titles in 2006–07 and 2007–08 seasons.

See also 

 Breakdown of State Seats Representatives, elected in 2018
 Kingdom of Kubang Pasu Darul Qiyam
 Kingdom of Setul Mambang Segara
 Proclamation of Malaysia

Bibliography 
 James C. Scott, Weapons of the Weak: Everyday Forms of Peasant Resistance (1985)

References

External links

 
States of Malaysia
Peninsular Malaysia
Andaman Sea
Feudalism in Malaysia
British Malaya in World War II
Strait of Malacca
Malaysia–Thailand border
Geoparks in Malaysia